Shyganak or Shaganak, is a salt lake in Aktogay District, Pavlodar Region, Kazakhstan.

Geography
Shyganak is an endorheic lake lying at the southern end of the Ishim Plain. Smaller salt lakes and salt marshes surround it. The lake has an irregular shape, its shores are flat, swampy in the southern part. Shyganak freezes in early November and thaws in late April.

The Shiderti river flows into the lake from the southeast. In its last section the river is named Karasu. In years of exceptional snowfall, the waters of the Shiderti (Karasu) may fill the whole lake basin, flow out of lake Shyganak and reach the larger lake Zhalauli to the north, but only very rarely.

See also
List of lakes of Kazakhstan

References

External links
Озера и реки Казахстана (in Russian)

Lakes of Kazakhstan
Endorheic lakes of Asia
Pavlodar Region
West Siberian Plain